Bernstein v. United States is a set of court cases brought by Daniel J. Bernstein challenging restrictions on the export of cryptography from the United States.

History
The case was first brought in 1995, when Bernstein was a student at University of California, Berkeley, and wanted to publish a paper and associated source code on his Snuffle encryption system. Bernstein was represented by the Electronic Frontier Foundation, who hired outside lawyer Cindy Cohn and also obtained pro bono publico assistance from Lee Tien of Berkeley; M. Edward Ross of the San Francisco law firm of Steefel, Levitt & Weiss; James Wheaton and Elizabeth Pritzker of the First Amendment Project in Oakland; and Robert Corn-Revere, Julia Kogan, and Jeremy Miller of the Washington, DC, law firm of Hogan & Hartson. After four years and one regulatory change, the Ninth Circuit Court of Appeals ruled that software source code was speech protected by the First Amendment and that the government's regulations preventing its publication were unconstitutional.  Regarding those regulations, the EFF states:

The government requested en banc review. In Bernstein v. U.S. Dept. of Justice, 192 F.3d 1308 (9th Cir. 1999), the Ninth Circuit ordered that this case be reheard by the en banc court, and withdrew the three-judge panel opinion, Bernstein v. U.S. Dept. of Justice, 176 F.3d 1132 (9th Cir. 1999).

The government modified the regulations again, substantially loosening them, and Bernstein, now a professor at the University of Illinois at Chicago, challenged them again. This time, he chose to represent himself, although he had no formal legal training. On October 15, 2003, almost nine years after Bernstein first brought the case, the judge dismissed it and asked Bernstein to come back when the government made a "concrete threat".

Recent 
Apple cited Bernstein v. US in its refusal to hack the San Bernardino shooter's iPhone, saying that they could not be compelled to "speak" (write code).

See also

 Junger v. Daley
 PGP criminal investigation

References

External links
 Bernstein v. United States
 Netlitigation Summary: Bernstein v. U.S. Dept. of State
 EPIC Archive of 9th Circuit Decision
 EFF Archive of the Cases
 

Cryptography law
United States Internet case law
Electronic Frontier Foundation litigation
1996 in United States case law
1997 in United States case law
United States Court of Appeals for the Ninth Circuit cases
United States District Court for the Northern District of California cases